Xyloglucan endotransglucosylase (XET) is an apoplastic enzyme found across the plant kingdom. The enzyme catalyzes the endotransglucosylation of two xyloglucan polysaccharides, effectively 'stitching' them together.

Function in planta 
XET is thought to promote cell expansion by breaking the xyloglucan cross-links between cellulose microfibrils before reforming them, potentially now linked to another microfibril.

References 

EC 3.2